Meet Miss Young and Her All Boy Band is Kristeen Young's debut studio album.

Track listing
All tracks composed by Kristeen Young
"8" -
"Programme X" -
"Fishnet" -
"Marley's Ghost" -
"Sweetest Freedom" -
"Cherry" -
"(Don't Go) Back to School" -
"Yummy" -
"Friend or Faux" - 
"P.E.9.14." -
"Corpulent and Indolent" -
"Now You Can Not Live" -
"Human Kind" -

Personnel
Kristeen Young - vocals, keyboards
Chris Sauer - bass
"Baby" Jeff White - drums, percussion

References

External links
 http://kristeenyoung.com

Kristeen Young albums
1997 debut albums